Downtown is an American crime drama television series that aired on CBS from September 27, 1986 until August 22, 1987.

Premise
An LAPD veteran is assigned with supervising four parolees who help him solve crimes.

Cast
Michael Nouri as Detective John Forney
Robert Englund as Dennis Shotoffer
Milicent Martin as Harriet Conover
Blair Underwood as Terry Corsaro
Mariska Hargitay as Jesse Smith
Virginia Capers as Delia Bonner
David Paymer as Captain David Kiner

Episodes

References

External links

1986 American television series debuts
1987 American television series endings
1980s American crime drama television series
English-language television shows
Fictional portrayals of the Los Angeles Police Department
CBS original programming
Television series by Sony Pictures Television
Television shows set in Los Angeles